Robert Nichol may refer to:

Robert Nichol (Canadian politician) (c. 1780–1824), businessman, judge and political figure in Upper Canada
Robert Nichol (cinematographer), Canadian cinematographer, director, and writer
Robert Nichol (Scottish politician), British Member of Parliament for East Renfrewshire, 1922–1924

See also
Robert Nichols (disambiguation)
Robert Nicoll (1814–1837), Scottish poet
 Rob Nicol, New Zealand cricketer